The 2007 Junior Pan American Artistic Gymnastics Championships was held in Guatemala City, Guatemala, November 19–26, 2007.

Medal summary

Medal table

References

2007 in gymnastics
Artistic Gymnastics Junior,2007}
International gymnastics competitions hosted by Guatemala